A Quaker is a members of the Religious Society of Friends, a faith-based community.

Quaker may also refer to:

Food and beverages 

 Quaker Oats Company, a U.S. food company
 Cuáker, an Ecuadorian beverage made from oats (a loanword of "quaker")
 "Quaker", a term used in coffee roasting to denote an unripe or poorly roasted coffee bean, the number of which is often used to judge the quality of a batch of coffee

Animals and plants
 Quaker butterfly (Neopithecops zalmora)
 Quaker lady (disambiguation), name given to several flowers
 Quaker parrot, also known as the monk parakeet (Myiopsitta monachus)
 Quaker, one of several names for Dissosteira carolina, also known as the Carolina grasshopper

Brands and enterprises
 Quaker State, a former motor oil manufacturer

People with the name
 Bernard Barton (1784-1849), sometimes referred to as "The Quaker Poet"
 John Greenleaf Whittier (1807-1892), nicknamed "The Quaker Poet"
 See List of Quakers

Places
 Quaker, Indiana (or Quaker Point), an unincorporated community in Vermillion County, Indiana
 Quaker, Missouri, an unincorporated community
 Pennsylvania, sometimes called "The Quaker State"
 Quakers Hill, New South Wales, a suburb in Sydney, Australia

Sport
 Quakers, the nickname of Darlington F.C. in the north of England and many other businesses in Darlington
 Quakers, the nickname for the athletic teams of Earlham College
 Quakers, the nickname for the athletic teams of Guilford College
 Quakers, the nickname for the athletic teams of Orchard Park, New York
 Quakers, the nickname for the athletic teams of Salem, Ohio
 Penn Quakers, the athletic teams of the University of Pennsylvania
Philadelphia Quakers, a defunct National Hockey League team

Pop culture
 Quakers (band), a hip-hop supergroup
 Quaker, a player of the video game Quake
 "Quaker", a song by the American band Bright from the album The Albatross Guest House

See also 
 Quake (disambiguation)
 Quackers, a puppet who appeared with Ray Alan